The fifth series of Mam talent! began airing on TVN on 1 September 2012 and ended on 24 November 2012. All three judges from the previous series: Agnieszka Chylińska, Małgorzata Foremniak and Robert Kozyra returned to judge the contestants. Marcin Prokop and Szymon Hołownia present the show again. The series was won by acrobatic duo Delfina & Bartek, with dancing duo Pitzo & Polssky coming second. Acrobat Anna Filipowska came third.

Auditions

The pre-auditions took place in Poznań, Zabrze, Wrocław, Szczecin, Lublin, Rzeszów, Warsaw and Gdańsk from the beginning of April 2012 starting in Poznań and ending in Gdańsk in June 2012. These were to be followed by judges' auditions held in theatres in Katowice, Wrocław, Gdańsk, Warsaw and Kraków between 18 June and 15 July 2012.

Auditionees could also send a video of their performance via Mam talent! website instead of participating in pre-audition.

Semi-finals
The live shows began on 20 October 2012.

Each show featured a guest performance. Runner-up of the first series Klaudia Kulawik performed on the first show while runner-up of the third series Kamil Bednarek performed on the second. The third featured another finalist of the third series Sabina Jeszka and the fourth featured the series 4 runner-up Piotr Karpienia. Finalists of the first series AudioFeels performed on the fifth show.

Semi-finalists

Semi-finals summary

Semi-final 1 (20 October)
 Guest performers: Klaudia Kulawik - "Only Hope"

Semi-final 2 (27 October)
 Guest performers: Kamil Bednarek - "Think About Tomorrow"

Semi-final 3 (3 November)
 Guest performers: Sabina Jeszka - "Good Times"

Semi-final 4 (10 November)
 Guest performers: Piotr Karpienia - "Świat Za Lustrem"

Semi-final 5 (17 November)
 Guest performers: AudioFeels - "What does it mean?"

Final (24 November 2012)
 Guest performer: Ewelina Lisowska - "Nieodporny rozum"

Live show chart

Ratings

References

2012 Polish television seasons
Mam talent!